SS Charles S. Haight was a Liberty ship built in the United States during World War II. She was named after Charles Haight, a member of the New Jersey General Assembly and the U.S. House of Representatives from New Jersey.

Construction
Charles S. Haight was laid down on 15 August 1944, under a Maritime Commission (MARCOM) contract, MC hull 2376, by J.A. Jones Construction, Brunswick, Georgia; she was sponsored by Mrs. Glenn Fite, and launched on 23 September 1944.

History
She was allocated to Marine Transport Lines, on 3 October 1944. On 1 April 1947, she was grounded off Cape Ann, near Rockport, Massachusetts, she was declared a Constructive Total Loss (CTL) the next day. On 30 December 1947, she was sold for $500, to A. Joseph Martell & Arthur Wagner, without restrictions.

References

Bibliography

 
 
 
 
 

 

Liberty ships
Ships built in Brunswick, Georgia
1944 ships
Maritime incidents in 1946